Keren Madora Everett (née Graham) is an American-born linguist and Christian missionary.
Keren Everett has spent many years in the Amazon studying the Pirahã tribe and their language.

The Pirahã language is of great interest to linguists, but only a few people apart from the Pirahã tribe are fluent in it. Keren Everett's former husband Daniel Everett, whom she married in 1969, is the best-known authority on the language. He acknowledges his ex-wife as an expert on the prosody of Pirahã.  They lived among the Pirahã from 1978 to 1983 and from 1999 to 2002.  Following their separation in 2005, Keren returned to Brazil where, as of 2007, she was continuing her missionary work among the Pirahã.

Publications
 Keren M. Everett, "The acoustic correlates of stress in Piraha". Journal of Amazonian Languages vol.1 no.2, pp. 104–162.  March 1998.
 Daniel L. Everett and Keren M. Everett, "On the relevance of Syllable Onsets to Stress Placement." Linguistic Inquiry vol. 15, pp. 705–711. 1984.

References

Living people
American expatriates in Brazil
American Protestant missionaries
Female Christian missionaries
Protestant missionaries in Brazil
Missionary linguists
Year of birth missing (living people)
Linguists from the United States